The 2021 Western Illinois Leathernecks football team represented Western Illinois University as a member of the Missouri Valley Football Conference (MVFC) for the 2021 NCAA Division I FCS football season. They were led by fourth-year head coach Jared Elliott. The Leathernecks played their home games at Hanson Field in Macomb, Illinois.

Schedule

References

Western Illinois
Western Illinois Leathernecks football seasons
Western Illinois Leathernecks football